is a former Japanese football player.

Playing career
Ohashi was born in Yokohama on June 23, 1981. He joined J1 League club Yokohama F. Marinos from youth team in 1999. He played several matches as offensive midfielder until 2000. In 2001, he moved to J2 League club Mito HollyHock on loan. He played many matches as regular player. In 2002, he returned to Yokohama F. Marinos. However he could hardly play in the match. In August 2002, he moved to J2 club Albirex Niigata on loan. In 2003, he returned to Yokohama F. Marinos. Although he could not play many matches until 2004, he became a regular player as offensive midfielder in 2005. In 2006, he moved to J2 club Tokyo Verdy and played many matches. In 2007, he moved to Kawasaki Frontale. He played many matches as substitute midfielder in 2 seasons. In 2009, he moved to South Korean club Gangwon FC. He is the third Japanese footballer who played in the K-League. Ohashi scored his first goal in the K-League in Gangwon FC, against Suwon Samsung Bluewings on May 2, 2009. In 2010, he returned to Japan and joined J2 club Mito HollyHock for the first time in 9 years. He played many matches as regular player. In 2011, he moved to Gangwon FC again. However he could not play at all in the match for injury and left the club in June. In August 2011, he returned to Japan and joined Japan Football League club Matsumoto Yamaga FC. The club was promoted to J2 from 2012. He retired end of 2012 season.

Club statistics

Honours
Yokohama F. Marinos
J1 League
 Champion (2) : 2003, 2004
 Runner-up (1) : 2000

Kawasaki Frontale
J1 League Runner-up (1) : 2008
J.League Cup Runner-up (1) : 2007

References

External links

1981 births
Living people
Association football people from Kanagawa Prefecture
Japanese footballers
J1 League players
J2 League players
Japan Football League players
K League 1 players
Yokohama F. Marinos players
Mito HollyHock players
Albirex Niigata players
Tokyo Verdy players
Kawasaki Frontale players
Matsumoto Yamaga FC players
Gangwon FC players
Japanese expatriate footballers
Japanese expatriate sportspeople in South Korea
Expatriate footballers in South Korea
Association football midfielders